Richard Fortescue (died 1655) was an English soldier he fought in the English Civil War and the Anglo-Spanish War (1654–60). He commanded a regiment at the Siege of Santo Domingo in April 1655. He participated in the invasion of Jamaica and when his commanding officer Robert Venables left Jamaica for England in late July1655, he took over command of the Army in Jamaica. However he died three months later in October 1655.

References

1655 deaths
Roundheads
Governors of Jamaica
English generals